Miklós Konkoly-Thege (b. 20 January 1842 - d. 17 February 1916) was a Hungarian astronomer and land-owner noble.

History
He studied astronomy and physics at the universities of Budapest (1857-1860) and Berlin (1860-1862).  After his studies he continued to visit the observatories of Göttingen, Greenwich, Heidelberg and  Paris.  During 1871 Konkoly-Thege constructed a telescope within his castle-residence, and in 1874  constructed  an observatory  in his palace park within Ógyalla; observations from here were used by Radó Kövesligethy to produce the  Ógyallan Catalogue of Spectra.
  From 1890 till 1911 he was the director of the Hungarian Institute of Meteorology and Geomagnetism. He has donated his private observatory to the state (Konkoly Observatory). Ha was a member of the Hungarian Academy of Sciences, and was also a member of the Parliament.

Handbooks
Praktische Anleitung zur Anstellung astronomischer Beobachtungen mit besonderer Rücksicht auf die Astrophysik, nebst einer modernen Instrumentenkunde, Braunschweig, 1883 

Praktische Anleitung zur Himmelsphotographie nebst einer kurzgefassten Anleitung zur modernen photographischen Operation und der Spectralphotographie im Cabinet, Halle, 1887 

Handbuch für Spectroscopiker in Cabinet und am Fernrohr. Halle, 1890

See also
Konkoly Observatory
Koppán (genus)

References 

Hungarian nobility
1842 births
1916 deaths
19th-century Hungarian astronomers